Paramount Network is a Dutch free-to-cable television channel in the Netherlands, based on the American rebranded Paramount Network. The television channels launched as Spike on 1 October 2015. It was the third Spike channel next to the US and UK version of the channel. The television channel aimed at an audience of mainly men. Initially it only broadcast daily between 21:00 and 2:30, time-sharing with Nickelodeon. As of 12 December 2016 the channel is broadcasting 24 hours a day in the Netherlands. Until 6 January 2021, the channel was also available in Flanders. On 24 May 2022, the channel was renamed by Paramount Network.

History
On 18 August 2015, Viacom announced that Spike would launch in the Netherlands and Flanders on 1 October 2015. It started broadcasting at night and broadcasts from 21:00 to 2:30 on Nickelodeon, replacing TeenNick in its time slot. This brings the American Spike channel for the first time in the Netherlands and Belgium.

On 12 December 2016 Spike launched as a 24-hours channel on Ziggo in the Netherlands, followed by KPN, Telfort, XS4ALL, Caiway and T-Mobile Thuis 3 months later. Nickelodeon became a 24-hours channel again. On some platforms in the Netherlands, and in Flanders Spike keeps on time-sharing daily between 21:05 and 5:00 with Nickelodeon, which is 2.5 hours longer than before 12 December 2016.

On 18 January 2018, the American channel Spike was rebranded as Paramount Network by Viacom Media Networks to closely associate with the Paramount Pictures movie studio. Later followed by 5Spike in the UK. The Dutch channel has been renamed by Paramount Network on 24 May 2022.

In December 2020 it was announced that Spike will stop broadcasting in Flanders on 6 January 2021. Since that day, Nickelodeon is broadcasting 24 hours a day in Flanders.

Programming

Local shows
 Gamekings (Netherlands & Flanders)
 Ink Master: Meester van de lage landen
 Nieky The Natural - Knokt Door (Netherlands) (Realityshow featuring Nieky Holzken)
 Tattoo Disasters (Netherlands)

Imports
 The Amazing Race
 Bar Rescue
 Bellator MMA
 Coaching Bad
 Face Off
 Framework
 Frankenfood
 Glory
 Glory Superfight Series
 Gym Rescue
 Hungry Investors
 Ink Master
 Ink Master Redemption
 Kingdom
 Knife Fight
 Lip Sync Battle
 The Magicians
 Spartan Ultimate Team Challenge
 Steve Austin's Broken Skull Challenge
 Tattoo Disasters UK
 Top Gear
 Wynonna Earp
  Ghost adventures

See also
Paramount Network

References

External links
 

Television channels in the Netherlands
Defunct television channels in Belgium
Television channels and stations established in 2015
2015 establishments in Europe
Paramount Network